Sinyar may refer to:
Sinyar people
Sinyar language

Language and nationality disambiguation pages